The 1895 Wake Forest Baptists football team was an American football team that represented Wake Forest College during the 1895 college football season.

Schedule

References

Wake Forest
Wake Forest Demon Deacons football seasons
College football undefeated seasons
College football winless seasons
Wake Forest Baptists football